Ashlie Marie Andrews (born 4 January 1993) is a Canadian goalball player who competes in international level events.

References

External links
 
 

1993 births
Living people
Goalball players at the 2012 Summer Paralympics
Goalball players at the 2016 Summer Paralympics
Paralympic goalball players of Canada
People with albinism
Sportspeople from Prince George, British Columbia
Medalists at the 2011 Parapan American Games
Medalists at the 2015 Parapan American Games